Arabi Malayalam script (Malayalam: അറബി-മലയാളം, Arabi Malayalam: عَرَبِ مَلَیَاۻَمٛ), also known as Ponnani script, is a writing system — a variant form of the Arabic script with special orthographic features — for writing Arabi Malayalam, a Dravidian language in southern India. Though the script originated and developed in Kerala, today it is predominantly used in Malaysia and Singapore by the migrant Muslim community. 

Until the 20th century, the script was widely taught to all Muslims, including young women, in the primary education madrasahs of Kerala. Arabi-Malayalam is currently used in some of the primary education madrasahs of Kerala and Lakshadweep.

Letters 
There were many complications to write Malayalam, a Dravidian language, using letters covering Arabic, a Semitic language. Only 28 letters were available from Arabic orthography to render over 53 phonemes of Malayalam. It was overcome by following the pattern of creating additional letters established for Persian.

Vowels

അ = اَ
ആ = آ
ഇ = اِ
ഈ = اِي
ഉ = اُ
ഊ = اُو
ഋ = رْ
എ = ا٘
ഏ = ا٘ي
ഐ = اَيْ
ഒ = اٗ
ഓ = اٗو
ഔ = اَوْ
അം = اَمْ

Consonants

ക = ك/ک
ഖ = كھ
ഗ = گ
ഘ = گھ
ങ = ۼ
ച = چ
ഛ = چھ
ജ = ج
ഝ = جھ
ഞ = ڿ
ട = ڊ
ഠ = ڊھ
ഡ = ڗ
ഢ = ڗھ
ണ = ڹ
ത = ت
ഥ = تھ
ദ = د
ധ = دھ
ന = ن
പ = پ
ഫ = پھ/ف
ബ = ب
ഭ = بھ
മ = م
യ = ي
ര = ڔ
ല = ل
വ = و
ശ = ش
ഷ = ۺ
സ = س
ഹ = ھ/ﮭ
ള = ۻ
ഴ = ژ
റ = ر
റ്റ = ڔّ

Usage 
Most of the Mappila Songs were written, for the first time, in Arabi-Malayalam script. The earliest known such work is the Muhyidheen Mala, written in 1607.
Many literary works written in Arabi Malayalam still have not been transliterated to the Malayalam script, and some estimates put the number at almost 90 percent. These works, romantic ballads, folk tales and battle songs, contain some of the impressive literary achievements by Mappilas over the centuries.

The first Arabi Malayalam scripted novel, Chahar Dervesh, Malayalam translation of a Persian work, was published in 1883. Intellectuals such as Moyinkutty Vaidyar translated, and then transliterated significant number of works in Sanskrit - such as Ashtanga Hridaya, Amarakosa, Pancatantra and even the legends about the Hindu king Vikramaditya - into Arabi Malayalam. Sanskrit medical texts - such as Upakarasara, Yogarambha and Mahasara - were also translated, and then transliterated into Arabi-Malayalam by scholars like Abdurahiman Musaliar of Ponnani Putiyakattu. Arabi Malayalam script periodicals made remarkable contributions to the reform movement amongst the Mappilas in the early 20th century.

See also
 Arabi Malayalam, a dialect of Malayalam used by Mappila Muslims
 Beary language
 Arwi

References

External links

Arabi Malayalam
Islamic culture
Arabic alphabets
Arabic alphabets for South Asian languages